Buda is a commune in Călărași District, Moldova. It is composed of two villages, Buda and Ursari.

References

Communes of Călărași District